The following is a discography of solo production by DJ Quik.

1991

2nd II None - 2nd II None 
 01. "Intro"
 02. "More Than a Player"
 Sample Credit: "Love and Happiness" by Al Green
 Sample Credit: "Funky President" by James Brown 
 Sample Credit: "Flying Saucers" by Richard Pryor 
 Sample Credit: "Sweet Black Pussy" by DJ Quik 
 03. "If You Want It"
 Sample Credit: "Hung Up on My Baby" by Isaac Hayes
 Sample Credit: "Movin" by Brass Construction
 04. "Be True To Yourself"
 Sample Credit: "Kung Fu" by Curtis Mayfield 
 05. "Let The Rhythm Take You" (feat. AMG)
 Sample Credit: "Papa Was Too" by Joe Tex 
 06. "Comin' Like This" (feat. DJ Quik, Hi-C & AMG)
 Sample Credit: "The Guns of Brixton" by The Clash 
 07. "Underground Terror"
 Sample Credit: "Life is for Learning" by Marvin Gaye 
 08. "Just Ain't Me"
 09. "The Life of a Player"
 10. "Ain't Nothin' Wrong" (feat. DJ Quik)
 Sample Credit: "Ain't Nothin' Wrong" by KC and the Sunshine Band 
 Sample Credit: "Lady Marmalade" by Labelle 
 11. "What Goes Up"
 Sample Credit: "Spinning Wheel" by Blood, Sweat & Tears 
 12. "Mystic"
  Sample Credit: "My Little Girl" by Bobbi Humphrey
 13. "Punk Mutha Phuckaz"
 Sample Credit: "All the Way Lover" by Millie Jackson 
 14. "Niggaz Trippin'" (feat. DJ Quik, AMG & Hi-C)
 Sample Credit: "Genius of Love" by Tom Tom Club 
 Sample Credit: "Give Up the Funk (Tear the Roof Off the Sucker)" by Parliament

AMG - Bitch Betta Have My Money 
 14. "Nu Exasize"
  Sample Credit: "Watermelon Man" by Herbie Hancock

DJ Quik - Quik Is the Name 
 01. "Sweet Black Pussy"
  Sample Credit: "Ooh Boy" by Rose Royce 
 02. "Tonite"
  Sample Credit: "Tonight" by Kleeer 
 03. "Born and Raised In Compton"
  Sample Credit: "Hyperbolicsyllabicsesquedalymistic" by Isaac Hayes 
  Sample Credit: "Hardcore Jollies" by Funkadelic 
  Sample Credit: "She's Not Just Another Woman" by 8th Day 
  Sample Credit: "Compton's N the House" by N.W.A 
 04. "Deep" (feat. 2nd II None & AMG)
  Sample Credit: "Between Two Sheets" & "Four Play" by Fred Wesley & the Horny Horns 
 05. "Tha Bombudd"
 06. "Dedication"
 07. "Quik Is the Name"
  Sample Credit: "I Just Want to Be" by Cameo 
 08. "Loked Out Hood"
  Sample Credit: "Do You Like It" by B.T. Express 
  Sample Credit: "Pumpin' It Up" by P-Funk All-Stars 
 09. "8 Ball" (Produced with Courtney Branch & Tracy Kendrick)
  Sample Credit: "Chameleon" by Herbie Hancock 
 10. "Quik's Groove"
  Sample Credit: "Without Love" by Peter Brown 
 11. "Tear It Off" (feat. AMG)
  Sample Credit: "Once You Got It" by B.T. Express 
  Sample Credit: "You Got to Have A Mother for Me" by James Brown 
 12. "I Got That Feelin'"
  Sample Credit: "I Got That Feelin'" by The Emotions 
 13. "Skanless" (feat. Hi-C, 2nd II None & AMG)
  Sample Credit: "That's Enough for Me" by Patti Austin

Hi-C - Skanless 
 05. "Funky Rap Sanga"
 08. "Compton Hoochi"
 10. "Bullshit"

1992

DJ Quik - Way 2 Fonky 
 01. "America'z Most Complete Artist"
  Sample Credit: "N.T." by Kool & the Gang 
  Sample Credit: "Remember the Children" by Earth, Wind & Fire 
  Sample Credit: "The Big Bang Theory" by Parliament 
 02. "Mo' Pussy"
  Sample Credit: "Shake" by The Gap Band 
  Sample Credit: "I Don't Believe You Want to Get Up and Dance (Oops)" by The Gap Band 
 03. "Way 2 Fonky"
  Sample Credit: "More Bounce to the Ounce" by Zapp 
 04. "Jus Lyke Compton"
  Sample Credit: "Hook and Sling" by Eddie Bo 
  Sample Credit: "Wino Dealing With Dracula" by Richard Pryor 
 05. "Quik'z Groove II [For U 2 Rip 2]"
  Sample Credit: "Africano" by Earth, Wind & Fire 
  Sample Credit: "Explain It to Her Mama" by The Temprees 
 06. "Me Wanna Rip Ya Girl"
 07. "When You're a Gee" (feat. Playa Hamm)
  Sample Credit: "I Heard It Through the Grapevine" by Roger Troutman 
  Sample Credit: "UFO" by Richard Pryor 
 08. "No Bullshit" (feat. KK)
 09. "Only Fo' Tha Money" (feat. 2nd II None)
 10. "Let Me Rip Tonite"
 11. "Niggaz Still Trippin'" (feat. AMG, Hi-C, JFN & 2nd II None)
  Sample Credit: "Movin'" by Brass Construction 
  Sample Credit: "Let's Dance" by Pleasure 
  Sample Credit: "You Can Make It If You Try" by Sly and the Family Stone 
  Sample Credit: "Ffun" by Con Funk Shun 
 12. "Tha Last Word"

Penthouse Players Clique - Paid the Cost 
 04. "Trust No Bitch" (feat. DJ Quik, AMG & Eazy-E)
  Sample Credit: "Funky Worm" by Ohio Players 
 10. "Explanation of a Playa"
  Sample Credit: "N.T." by Kool & the Gang 
 13. "P.S. Phuk U 2" (feat. DJ Quik & Eazy-E)

Various Artists - Class Act (soundtrack) 
 06. "A Class Act II (Rap Version)" (Penthouse Players Clique)

1993

Candyman - I Thought U Knew 
 04. "Candyman, Do Me Right"
 10. "I Thought U Knew"

Juvenile Committee - Free Us Colored Kids 
 02. "Juvenile Thang" (feat. DJ Quik & Playa Hamm)

Various Artists - Menace II Society (soundtrack) 
 15. "Can't Fuck Wit a Nigga" (DJ Quik feat. KK & JFN)
  Sample Credit: "Word 2 Tha D" by AMG 
  Sample Credit: "Deep" by DJ Quik

1994

Shello - The Homegirl 
 03. "Sweet Love and Extasy"
 04. "Good Thang"
 06. "Street Niggaz"

Str8-G - Shadow of a G 
 13. "Bring the Funk (Remix)" (feat. 2nd II None & DJ Quik)

Various Artists - Above the Rim (soundtrack) 
 05. "Didn't Mean to Turn You On" (2nd II None)
  Sample Credit: "I Don't Believe You Want to Get Up and Dance" by The Gap Band 
 14. "Crack 'Em" (O.F.T.B.)
  Sample Credit: "Playing Your Game Baby" by Barry White

Various Artists - Murder Was the Case 
 08. "Come When I Call" (Danny Boy)
  Sample Credit: "Let Me Love You" by Michael Henderson 
 11. "Woman to Woman"  (Jewell) (Produced with G-One)
  Sample Credit: "Woman to Woman" by Shirley Brown 
 12. "Dollaz + Sense" (DJ Quik)
  Sample Credit: "I Like (What You're Doing to Me)" by Young & Company

1995

DJ Quik - Safe + Sound 
 01. "Street Level Entrance"
 02. "Get at Me"
 Sample Credit: "Rigor Mortis" by Cameo 
 Sample Credit: "Conscience" by Sun 
 Sample Credit: "Bitch Betta Have My Money" by AMG 
 03. "Diggin' U Out"
 Sample Credit: "I Get Lifted" by George McCrae 
 04. "Safe + Sound" (Produced with G-One)
 Sample Credit: "I Wanna Be Your Lover" by Prince 
 05. "Somethin' 4 tha Mood" (Produced with G-One)
 06. "Don't You Eat It (Interlude)"
 Sample Credit: "Don't Fight the Feeling" by One Way 
 07. "Can I Eat It?"
 08. "It'z Your Fantasy" (Produced with G-One)
 Sample Credit: "California My Way" by The Main Ingredient 
 09. "Tha Ho in You" (feat. 2nd II None & Hi-C)
 10. "Dollaz + Sense"
 Sample Credit: "I Like (What You're Doing to Me)" by Young & Company 
 11. "Let You Havit"
 Sample Credit: "Long Stroke" by ADC Band 
 12. "Summer Breeze"
 Sample Credit: "You Like Me Don't You" by Jermaine Jackson 
 13. "Quik's Groove III" (Produced with Robert Bacon & G-One)
 14. "Sucka Free" (feat. Playa Hamm)
 Sample Credit: "Shack Up" by Banbarra 
 15. "Keep tha "P" in It" (feat. Playa Hamm, 2nd II None, Kam & 2-Tone)
 16. "Hoorah 4 tha Funk (Reprise)"
 17. "Tanqueray" (Bonus Track)
 Sample Credit: "Get Up to Get Down" by Brass Construction

Kam - Made in America 
 04. "That's My Nigga"

1996

2Pac – All Eyez On Me 
 08. "Heartz of Men"

Shaquille O'Neal - You Can't Stop the Reign 
 06. "Strait Playin'" (feat. Peter Gunz & DJ Quik)

Tony! Toni! Tone! - House of Music 
 03. "Let's Get Down" (feat. DJ Quik)

1997

Adina Howard - Welcome to Fantasy Island 
 02. "(Freak) And U Know It" (Produced with G-One & Robert Bacon)

Suga Free – Street Gospel 
 01. "Intro"
 02. "Why U Bullshittin'?"
 Sample Credit: "Darling Nikki" by Prince 
 03. "I'd Rather Give U My Bitch"
 Sample Credit: "Get Down on It" by Kool & the Gang 
 04. "Doe Doe and a Skunk"
  Sample Credit: "Nights of Pleasure" by Loose Ends 
 05. "Don't No Suckaz Live Here" (Produced with G-One & Robert Bacon)
 06. "Tip Toe" (feat. DJ Quik & Hi-C)
 07. "I Wanna Go Home (The County Jail Song)"
 08. "If U Stay Ready" (feat. Playa Hamm) (Produced with G-One & Robert Bacon)
 09. "Fly Fo Life"
 10. "On My Way" (feat. El DeBarge)
 11. "Secrets"
 12. "Table Interlude"
 13. "Dip Da" (Produced with G-One & Robert Bacon)
 14. "Tip Toe (Reprise)"

The Watts Prophets - When the 90's Came 
 07. "Trippin'"

Various Artists - Caught Up (soundtrack) 
 01. Ride On/Caught Up (Snoop Doggy Dogg feat. Kurupt) (Produced with Marc N Tha Dark & Snoop Doggy Dogg)

Various Artists - How to Be a Player (soundtrack) 
 03. "Hard To Get" (Rick James feat. Richie Rich)
 18. "If U Stay Ready (Remix)" (Suga Free feat. DJ Quik & Playa Hamm)

1998

Deborah Cox - One Wish 
 06. "One Wish" (feat. Gangsta D)

DJ Quik - Rhythm-al-ism 
 01. "Rhythm-al-ism (Intro)"
 02. "We Still Party"
 03. "So Many Wayz" (feat. 2nd II None & Peter Gunz) (Produced with G-One)
 04. "Hand In Hand" (feat. 2nd II None & El DeBarge)
 05. "Down, Down, Down" (feat. AMG, Suga Free & Mausberg)
 06. "You'z A Ganxta"
 07. "I Useta Know Her" (feat. AMG)
 08. "No Doubt" (feat. Playa Hamm & Suga Free)
 09. "Speed"
 Sample Credit: "Mom" by Earth, Wind, and Fire 
 10. "Whateva U Do" (Produced with G-One)
 Sample Credit: "So In Love" by Smokey Robinson 
 11. "Thinkin' Bout U"
 12. "El's Interlude" (feat. El DeBarge)
 13. "Medley For A "V" (The Pussy Medley)" (feat. Snoop Dogg, Nate Dogg, 2nd II None, Hi-C, AMG & El DeBarge) (Produced with G-One)
 14. "Bombudd II"
 15. "Get 2Getha Again" (feat. 2nd II None, AMG, Hi-C & El DeBarge)
 16. "Reprise (Medley For A "V")" (Produced with G-One)

Jermaine Dupri - Life in 1472 
 14. "Three The Hard Way" (feat. Mr. Black & R.O.C.)

Luniz - Lunitik Muzik 
 05. "Just Mee & U" (feat. Raphael Saadiq) (Produced with G-One)
 Sample Credit: "Just, Me & You" by Tony! Toni! Tone!

Shaquille O'Neal - Respect 
 03. "The Way It's Goin' Down" (feat. Peter Gunz)

TQ - Westside 
 01. Westside Part II (My Melody) (Clean) (featuring DJ Quik, Hi-C, James DeBarge, Playa Hamm & Suga Free) (Produced with G-One)
 02. Westside Part II (My Melody) (Dirty) (featuring DJ Quik, Hi-C, James DeBarge, Playa Hamm & Suga Free) (Produced with G-One)
 03. Westside Part II (My Melody) (Instrumental) (Produced with G-One)

Various Artists - Down in the Delta (soundtrack) 
 15. "The Rain" (Tracie Spencer)

1999

2nd II None - Classic 220 
 02. "Up "N" Da Club" (feat. AMG & DJ Quik)
 03. "Don't U Hide It"
 04. "Whateva U Want" (feat. AMG & James DeBarge)
 05. "Make 'Em Understand" (feat. Mausberg)
 07. "Back Up of the Wall"
 08. "Y?"
 Sample Credit: "By Your Side" by Con Funk Shun 
 09. "If U Ain't Fuckin'"
 10. "Don't Do Dat"
 11. "Princess" (feat. James DeBarge)
 Sample Credit: "Yesterday Princess" by Stanley Clarke 
 13. "Got A Nu Woman" (feat. AMG, Hi-C, Playa Hamm & DJ Quik)

Snoop Dogg - No Limit Top Dogg 
 13. "Doin' Too Much"
 17. "Buss'n Rocks"
 19. "Don't Tell" (feat. Warren G, Nate Dogg & Mausberg)

Various Artists - Deep Blue Sea (soundtrack) 
 10. "Get Tha Money (Dollar Bill)" (Hi-C featuring DJ Quik)

Various Artists - Suge Knight Represents: Chronic 2000 
 13. "We Don't Love 'Em" (Top Dogg)
 17. "Late Night" (2Pac Feat. Outlawz & DJ Quik)

2000

8Ball & MJG - Space Age 4 Eva 
 06. "Buck Bounce" (feat. DJ Quik)
 12. "Jankie" (feat. DJ Quik)

AMG - Bitch Betta Have My Money 2001 
 03. "Perfection"
 04. "Soak Me Baby" (feat. DJ Quik)

DJ Quik - Balance & Options 
 01. "Change Da Game" (feat. Mausberg)
 02. "Did Y'all Feel Dat" (feat. Mausberg & Skaboobie)
 03. "We Came 2 Play" (feat. AMG & James DeBarge)
 04. "Pitch In on a Party"
 05. "I Don't Wanna Party Wit U"
 06. "Motex Records (Interlude)"
 07. "Sexuality"
 08. "How Come?"
 09. "U Ain't Fresh" (feat. Erick Sermon & Kam)
 10. "Roger's Groove"
 11. "Motex Records II (Interlude)"
 12. "Quikker Said Than Dunn"
  Sample Credit: "Eazy-er Said Than Dunn" by Eazy-E 
 13. "Straight from the Streets (Interlude)"
 14. "Speak on It" (feat. Mausberg & AMG)
 15. "Do Whatcha Want" (feat. Digital Underground & AMG)
  Sample Credit: "Let's Have Some Fun" by The Bar-Kays 
 16. "Well" (feat. Mausberg & Raphael Saadiq)
 17. "Quik's Groove V"
 18. "Do I Love Her?" (feat. Suga Free)
 19. "Tha Divorce Song" (feat. James DeBarge)
 20. "Balance & Options (Outro)"

Erick Sermon - Def Squad Presents Erick Onasis 
 09. "Focus" (feat. DJ Quik & Xzibit)
  Sample Credit: "It Doesn't Really Matter" by Zapp & Roger 
  Sample Credit: "Aqua Boogie (A Psychoalphadiscobetabioaquadoloop)" by Parliament

Mausberg - Non Fiction 
 02. "Ring King"
 04. "Get Nekkid" (feat. DJ Quik & James DeBarge)
 05. "Tha Truth Is..." (feat. DJ Quik)
 07. "Anyway U Want 2" (feat. Suga Free & James DeBarge)
 09. "No More Questions" (feat. DJ Quik)
 11. "I Can Feel That" (feat. AMG & Hi-C)
 12. "Bank On It" (feat. 2nd II None & Playa Hamm)
 13. "Mushrooms"
 14. "Pimpalistics"
 15. "Dick Ain't Free"

Xzibit - Restless 
 15. "Sorry I'm Away So Much" (feat. DJ Quik & Suga Free)

2001

2Pac - Until the End of Time 
 10. "Words 2 My First Born" (feat. Above the Law)

Big Syke - Big Syke Daddy 
 04. "Time Iz Money" (feat. DJ Quik & E-40)

Janet Jackson - All for You 
 02. "All for You (DJ Quik Remix)"

Kurupt - Space Boogie: Smoke Oddessey 
 06. "Can't Go Wrong" (feat. DJ Quik & Butch Cassidy)

Various Artists - Made (soundtrack) 
 09. "Do Whatchu Want" (DJ Quik feat. Digital Underground & AMG)
  Sample Credit: "Let's Have Some Fun" by The Bar-Kays

Won G. - No Better Than This 
 03. "Nothing's Wrong" (feat. DJ Quik & James DeBarge)

2002

2Pac - Better Dayz 
 11. "Late Night" (feat. DJ Quik & Outlawz)
  Sample Credit: "Have Your Ass Home by 11:00" by Richard Pryor 
  Sample Credit: "Wind Parade" by Donald Byrd 
  Sample Credit: "Last Night Changed It All (I Really Had a Ball)" by Esther Williams

DJ Quik - The Best of DJ Quik: Da Finale 
 01. "Quik Is the Name (Intro)"
 02. "Sweet Black Pussy"
  Sample Credit: "Ooh Boy" by Rose Royce 
 03. "Tonite"
  Sample Credit: "Tonight" by Kleeer 
 04. "Born and Raised In Compton"
  Sample Credit: "Hyperbolicsyllabicsesquedalymistic" by Isaac Hayes 
  Sample Credit: "Hardcore Jollies" by Funkadelic 
  Sample Credit: "She's Not Just Another Woman" by 8th Day 
  Sample Credit: "Compton's N the House" by N.W.A 
 05. "Loked Out Hood"
  Sample Credit: "Do You Like It" by B.T. Express 
  Sample Credit: "Pumpin' It Up" by Parliament-Funkadelic 
 06. "Safe + Sound" (Produced with G-One)
 Sample Credit: "I Wanna Be Your Lover" by Prince 
 07. "Dollaz + "
 Sample Credit: "I Like (What You're Doing to Me)" by Young & Company 
 08. "Summer Breeze"
 Sample Credit: "You Like Me Don't You" by Jermaine Jackson 
 09. "Quik's Groove VII"
 10. "Jus Lyke Compton"
  Sample Credit: "Hook and Sling" by Eddie Bo 
  Sample Credit: "Wino Dealing With Dracula" by Richard Pryor 
 11. "So Many Wayz" (feat. 2nd II None & Peter Gunz)
 12. "Hand In Hand" (feat. 2nd II None & El DeBarge)
 13. "Down, Down, Down" (feat. Suga Free, AMG & Mausberg)
 14. "You'z A Ganxta"
 15. "Speed"
 Sample Credit: "Mom" by Earth, Wind, and Fire 
 16. "Pitch In on a Party"
 17. "Do I Love Her?" (feat. Suga Free)
 18. "Streetz Iz Callin'" (feat. Chuckey)
 19. "Trouble" (feat. AMG)

DJ Quik - Under tha Influence 
 01. "Tha Proem" (feat. Hi-C, Talib Kweli & Shyheim)
  Sample Credit: "Love and Happiness" by Al Green 
 02. "Trouble" (feat. AMG)
 03. "Come 2Nyte" (feat. Truth Hurts)
 05. "Murda 1 Case" (feat. KK & Pharoahe Monch)
 06. "Ev'ryday" (feat. Hi-C & James DeBarge)
 07. "Get Loaded" (feat. AMG)
 08. "Gina Statuatorre" (feat. Chuckey)
 09. "50 Ways"
  Sample Credit: "50 Ways to Leave Your Lover" by Paul Simon 
 10. "Quik's Groove 6"
 11. "Get tha Money" (feat. Suga Free)
 12. "One on 1"
 13. "Sex Crymee"
 14. "Birdz & da Beez" (feat. Hi-C & AMG)
 15. "Oh Well"
 16. "Out"

Shade Sheist - Informal Introduction 
 04. "John Doe" (feat. DJ Quik, AMG, Hi-C & Swift)

Talib Kweli - Quality 
 10. "Put it in the Air" (feat. DJ Quik)

Truth Hurts - Truthfully Speaking 
 02. "Addictive" (feat. Rakim)
 Sample Credit: "Thoda Resham Lagta Hai" by Lata Mangeshkar 
 08. "Not Really Lookin'" (feat. DJ Quik)

2003

Chingy - Jackpot 
 16. "Bagg Up"

E-40 - Breakin' News 
 18. "Quarterbackin' (DJ Quik Remix)" (feat. Clipse)

Frost - Somethin' 4 the Riderz 
 17. "Let's Make a V" (feat. DJ Quik, King Tee & James DeBarge)

Hi-C - The Hi-Life Hustle 
 02. "Say Woop" (feat. Suga Free)
 06. "Coochie Coochie"
 07. "Let Me Know" (feat. DJ Quik & Fiedly)
  Sample Credit: "So Ruff, So Tuff" by Roger Troutman 
  Sample Credit: "All About U" by 2Pac 
 14. "Hit Me Where It Hurts"
 15. "Run Up, Done Up"
 17. "Do It" (feat. DJ Quik)

Hot Karl - I Like To Read 
 05. "Sump'n Changed" (feat. will.i.am)

Jay-Z - The Black Album 
 11. "Justify My Thug"
  Sample Credit: "Justify My Love" by Madonna 
  Sample Credit: "Rock Box" by Run DMC

Nate Dogg - Nate Dogg 
 03. "Get Up" (feat. Eve)
 09. "There She Goes" (feat. Warren G & DJ Quik)
  Sample Credit: "Don't Look Any Further" by Dennis Edwards

Rappin' 4-Tay - Gangsta Gumbo 
 03. "If It Wasn't 4 U" (feat. Suga Free & Nate Dogg)

Roscoe - Young Roscoe Philaphornia 
 08. "Get Flipped"

Various Artists - Malibu's Most Wanted (soundtrack) 
 11. "I Want You Girl" (Butch Cassidy)

Various Artists - True Crime: Streets of LA (soundtrack) 
 04. "Don't Fight The Pimpin" (Suga Free)

2004

2Pac - Loyal to the Game 
 17. "Loyal to the Game (DJ Quik Remix)" (feat. Big Syke & DJ Quik)

Knoc-turn'al - The Way I Am 
 09. "Love Slave"

Suga Free - The New Testament 
 02. "Why U Bullshittin'? (Part 2)"
 05. "Angry Enuff"
 06. "Born Again"
 10. "Don't Fight Da Pimpin'"
 Sample Credit: "Don't Fight The Feelin" by Too Short 
 13. "Yo Momma Yo Daddy"
 14. "She Get What She Pay Foe"
 15. "Circus Music" (feat. Chingy)

2005

DJ Quik - Trauma  
 01. "Doctor's Office"
 02. "Intro for Roger"
 03. "Fandango" (feat. B-Real)
 04. "Till Jesus Comes"
 05. "Black Mercedes" (feat. Nate Dogg)
 06. "Get Up" (feat. The Game & AMG)
 07. "Get Down" (feat. Chingy)
 08. "Ladies & Thugs" (feat. Wyclef Jean)
 09. "Catch 22"
 10. "Indiscretions in the Back of the Limo" (feat. T.I.)
 11. "Spur of the Moment (Pacific Coast Remix)" (feat. Ludacris)
 12. "Quikstrumental (Quik's Groove 7)" (feat. Jodeci)
 13. "Jet Set"
 14. "California" (feat. AMG)

Do or Die - D.O.D. 
 19. "Church" (feat. DJ Quik & Johnny P.)

Snoop Dogg - The Best of Snoop Dogg 
 17. "Ride On/Caught Up!" (feat. Kurupt) (Produced with Snoop Dogg & Mark N Tha Dark)

2006

Ak'Sent - International 
 07. "#1"

Maddi Madd - Holla Back 
 01. "Holla Back (featuring Jodeci)"

Xzibit - Full Circle 
 03. "Ram Part Division"

2007

Eazy-E - Featuring...Eazy-E 
 03. "Trust No Bitch" (Penthouse Players Clique feat. DJ Quik, AMG & Eazy-E)
  Sample Credit: "Funky Worm" by Ohio Players 
 15. "P.S. Phuk U 2" (Penthouse Players Clique feat. DJ Quik & Eazy-E)

Kurupt & J. Wells - Digital Smoke 
 14. "I Came In the Door" (feat. Kokane) (Produced with J. Wells)

Snoop Dogg - Snoop Dogg Presents: Unreleased Heatrocks 
 03. "Wanna B'z" (feat. Young Jeezy & Nate Dogg) (Produced with Teddy Riley)

The Fixxers - Midnight Life 
 09. "Smoke II Much"

Twiztid - Independents Day 
 04. "Hurt Someone" (feat. DJ Quik & Tha Dogg Pound)

X-Clan - Return from Mecca 
 12. "Brother, Brother" (feat. DJ Quik)

Yung Joc - Hustlenomics 
 06. "Cut Throat" (feat. The Game & Jim Jones)

2008

Maroon 5 - Call and Response: The Remix Album 
 07. "Shiver (DJ Quik Remix)"

Murs - Murs for President 
 04. "The Science" (Produced with Scoop DeVille)

Ray J - All I Feel 
 10. "Where You At" (feat. The Game)

Snoop Dogg - Ego Trippin' 
 02. "Press Play" (feat. Kurupt)
  Sample Credit: "Voyage To Atlantis" by The Isley Brothers 
 18. "Those Gurlz" (Produced with Teddy Riley & Scoop DeVille)
  Sample Credit: "Too Much Heaven" by The Bee Gees

The Game - LAX 
 16. "Dope Boys" (feat. Travis Barker) (Produced with 1500 or Nothin')

2009

DJ Quik & Kurupt - BlaQKout 
 01. "BlaQKout"
 02. "Cream N Ya Panties" (feat. Tre Mak)
 03. "Do You Know"
  Sample Credit: "Anniversary" by Raphael Saadiq 
  Sample Credit: "Back to Life" by Soul II Soul 
 04. "Whatcha Wanna Do" (feat. Yo-Yo & Problem)
 05. "Ohh!"
 06. "Fuck Y'all" (feat. Puff Johnson)
 07. "Hey Playa! (Moroccan Blues)"
 08. "Exodus"
 09. "9x's Outta 10"
 10. "Jupiter's Critic & the Mind of Mars"
 11. "The Appeal"
 12. "Problem: The B Stands for Beautiful"
 13. "Whatcha Wanna Do (Alternative Version)" (feat. Yo-Yo & Problem)

Mike Epps - Funny Bidness: Da Album 
 16. "I Love The Hoes" (feat. DJ Quik)

2010

Bishop Lamont - The Shawshank Redemption/Angola 3 
 22. "The Preformation" (feat. Kurupt & RBX)

Danny Boy - It's About Time 
 01. "Intro"
 02. "Blow Your Mind Away"
 03. "How Many Times"
 04. "Think It's About Time"
 05. "Between Me And U" (feat. Roger Troutman)
 07. "So In Love"
 08. "Church Interlude"
 09. "Can I Come Over"
 13. "Steppin'"
 14. "Mama Used To Say"
 15. "Come When I Call (Remix)" (Produced with G-One)

Kurupt - Streetlights 
 15. "Pay Me" (feat. Suga Free) (iTunes Bonus Track)

2011

DJ Quik - The Book of David 
 01. "Fire and Brimstone"
 02. "Do Today" (feat. BlaKKazz K.K. & Jon B.)
 03. "Ghetto Rendezvous"
 04. "Luv of My Life" (feat. Gift Reynolds) (Produced with G-One)
 05. "Babylon" (feat. Bizzy Bone & BlaKKazz K.K.)
 06. "Killer Dope"
 07. "Real Women" (feat. Jon B.)
  Sample Credit: "Children of the World United" by Angela Bofill 
 08. "Poppin'" (feat. BlaKKazz K.K.)
 09. "Hydromatic" (feat. Jon B. & Gift Reynolds)
  Sample Credit: "Greased Lightnin" by John Travolta 
 10. "Across the Map" (feat. Bun B & Bizzy Bone)
 11. "Nobody" (feat. Suga Free)
 12. "Boogie Till You Conk Out" (feat. Ice Cube)
 13. "Flow For Sale" (feat. Kurupt)
 14. "So Compton" (feat. BlaKKazz K.K.)
 15. "Time Stands Still" (feat. Dwele)
 16. "The End?" (feat. Garry Shider)
 17. "Quik's Groove 9"

Nick Cannon - Child of the Corn 
 17. "So Westcoast" (feat. DJ Quik) (Produced with G-One)

2013

Stalley - Honest Cowboy 
 01. "Spaceships & Woodgrain" (Produced with Cardo)

2014

DJ Quik - The Midnight Life 
 01. "Intro"
 02. "That Nigga'z Crazy"
 03. "Back That Shit Up" (feat. Tay F 3rd & David Blake II)
 04. "Trapped on the Tracks" (feat. Bishop Lamont & David Blake II)
 05. "El's Interlude 2" (feat. El DeBarge)
 06. "Puffin' the Dragon"
 07. "Pet Semetery"
 08. "Life Jacket" (feat. Suga Free & Dom Kennedy) (Produced with David Balfour)
 09. "That Getter" (feat. David Blake II)
 10. "The Conduct" (feat. Mack 10)
 11. "Shine" (featuring David Blake II)
 12. "Bacon's Groove" (feat. Rob "Fonksta" Bacon)
 13. "Broken Down" (feat. Suga Free & Tweed Cadillac)
 14. "Why'd You Have to Lie" (feat. Joi)
 15. "Fuck All Night"
 16. "Quik's Groove 9"

2015

The Game - The Documentary 2.5 
 2-10. "Quik's Groove (The One)" (feat. DJ Quik, Sevyn Streeter & Micah)

Uncertified 
 1999: Snoop Dogg - "Live from L.A." (feat. Ice Cube & Xzibit)
 2006: Busta Rhymes - "Died Too Soon" (feat. DJ Quik & The Game)
 2011: Young Ridaz - "Walk on Bye"
 2011: Potluck - "The Good Life" (feat. Cool Nutz)

Singles produced

References

External links 
Discogs.com - DJ Quik

Production discographies
Hip hop discographies
Discographies of American artists